The Return of the Condor Heroes is a Singaporean television series adapted from Louis Cha's novel of the same title. It was broadcast from 2 June to 27 July 1998 on TCS Eighth Frequency in Singapore and was later released on other Asian television networks.

Cast

 Christopher Lee as Yang Guo
 Cai Yiwei as Yang Guo (young)
 Fann Wong as Xiaolongnü
 Zhu Houren as Guo Jing
 Shirley Ho as Huang Rong
 Florence Tan as Guo Fu
 He Sixian as Guo Fu (young)
 Yvonne Lim as Guo Xiang
 Constance Song as Cheng Ying
 Chen Xiaoqing as Cheng Ying (young)
 Evelyn Tan as Lu Wushuang
 Zheng Xin'er as Lu Wushuang (young)
 Zheng Geping as Jinlun Fawang
 Pan Lingling as Li Mochou
 Chen Shucheng as Huang Yaoshi
 Yang Yue as Hong Qigong
 Richard Low as Ouyang Feng
 Liang Tian as Yideng
 Mak Hiu-wai as Zhou Botong
 Huang Shinan as Gongsun Zhi
 Deborah Sim as Gongsun Lü'e
 Zhu Xiufeng as Qiu Qianchi
 Li Nanxing as Lu Liding
 Zoe Tay as Lu Erniang
 Ix Shen as Huodu
 Yang Tianfu as Da'erba
 Yao Wenlong as Yelü Qi
 Joey Swee as Yelü Yan
 Lau Leng Leng as Wanyan Ping
 Andi Lim as Yin Zhiping
 Liang Weidong as Zhao Zhijing
 Ye Shipin as Qiu Qianren / Ci'en
 Yan Bingliang as Wu Santong
 Ding Lan as Wu Sanniang
 Huang Guoliang as Wu Xiuwen
 Lin Bingjun as Wu Xiuwen (young)
 Thomas Ng as Wu Dunru
 Wang Ruixian as Wu Dunru (young)
 Christie Wong as Shagu
 Chen Guohua as Lu Youjiao
 Aric Ho as Guo Polu
 Wu Kaishen as Kublai Khan
 Xu Meiluan as Hong Lingbo
 Zheng Wen as Xiaoxiangzi
 Zhong Shurong as Nimoxing
 Fu Youming as Zhu Ziliu
 Zhu Yuye as Yinggu
 Wang Guanlong as Feng Mofeng
 Li Haisheng as Qiu Chuji
 Yu Jialun as Hao Datong
 Lin Ruping as Sun Bu'er
 Chen Tianci as Ma Yu
 Guo Weiqiang as Wang Chuyi
 Zeng Sipei as Granny Sun
 Tang Hu as Ke Zhen'e
 Dai Peng as Fan Yiweng
 Yun Changcou as Big-headed Ghost

Nominations

Soundtrack

 Yuansan Yuanju (Yuyan) (緣散緣聚 (預言); Fate Comes and Leaves) - the main theme song, performed by Phil Chang and Fann Wong
 Gumu Qiyuan (古墓奇緣; Strange Encounter in the Ancient Tomb)
 Xueling Liqing (雪嶺離情; Separation on the Snowy Ridge)
 Jueqing Yougu (絕情幽谷; Passionless Valley)
 Yunü Xinjing (Shiqing) (玉女心經 (示情); Jade Maiden Heart Sutra (Expression of Love)) - sub theme song, performed by Fann Wong
 Xinmo Ruxue (心魔如血; Devil in the Heart is like Blood)
 Qinghuai Rusi (情懷如絲; Feelings Are Like Threads)
 Liangbin Rushuang (Yisheng Tai Duanzan) (兩鬢如霜 (一生太短暫); Hair Resembles Frost (Life is Too Short)) - sub theme song, performed by Christopher Lee
 Shendiao Xiangban (神鵰相伴; Divine Condor as Companion)
 Fenxin Huahui (Xinling Xiangtong) (焚心化灰 (心靈相通); Burning Heart Reduced to Ashes (Spiritual Link)) - sub theme song, performed by Chang Lufeng
 Xiazhi Dazhe (俠之大者; Hero)
 Hongyan Zhulei (紅顏珠淚; Beauty and Tears like Pearls) - performed by Chen Yuyun
 Sanmei Jinzhen (三枚金針; The Three Golden Needles)
 Yuansan Yuanju (緣散緣聚; Fate Comes and Leaves) - television version of the main theme, performed by Fann Wong and Phil Chang
 Xianlü Xianzong (俠侶仙踪; Heroic Couple's Immortal Trail)

External links
 

1998 Singaporean television series debuts
1998 Singaporean television series endings
Singaporean wuxia television series
Television shows based on The Return of the Condor Heroes
Television series set in the Southern Song
Television series set in the Mongol Empire
1990s romance television series
Television series about orphans
Channel 8 (Singapore) original programming